Cut Above the Rest is the seventh studio album by the English glam rock band Sweet, released on Polydor Records in October 1979. It was their first album release following the departure of their original lead vocalist Brian Connolly. Connolly had begun recording this album with the band at the TownHouse Studio in Shepherd's Bush, London, but his vocals were subsequently wiped and replaced by vocals from bass player Steve Priest and guitarist Andy Scott. Original outtakes of "Play All Night" and "Stay With Me" (a.k.a. "Log One/That Girl") featuring Connolly's vocals have been recovered and were released on the rarities CD Platinum Rare.

Cut Above the Rest was released with two different sleeves: one for the US/Canada/Japan/UK markets and another (a wood carving of the three members' faces) for Europe.

Reception

In their retrospective review, AllMusic described Cut Above the Rest as "a bizarre combination of the hard-rocking pop that dominated classic Sweet singles with progressive flights of fancy in a 10cc/Electric Light Orchestra vein, plus a dash of lounge lizard-ish soft rock balladry thrown in to cover all the pop/rock bases." They found that some of the excursions in this hodgepodge of styles were disastrous, but that the stronger cuts were distinctive and compelling enough to make the album as a whole memorable, albeit "too erratic" for casual listeners.

Track listing
All songs written and composed by Steve Priest, Andy Scott and Mick Tucker except where noted.
Side one
"Call Me" (Scott) - 3:42
"Play All Night" - 3:15
"Big Apple Waltz" (Priest, Scott) - 4:03
"Dorian Gray" - 4:44
"Discophony (Dis-Kof-O-Ne)" (Priest, Scott, Tucker, Gary Moberley) - 5:25
Side two
"Eye Games" (Scott, Louis Austin) - 1:58
"Mother Earth" (Priest, Scott) - 6:31
"Hold Me" (Scott) - 6:06
"Stay With Me" - 5:06

Bonus tracks on 2010 reissue
  "Call Me" (7" version) - 2:54
 "Why Don't You" - 3:25
 "Mother Earth" (7" version) - 3:59

Personnel
Sweet
 Steve Priest - bass, harmonica, lead vocals, backing vocals
 Andy Scott - guitar, synthesizer, lead vocals, backing vocals
 Mick Tucker - drums, percussion, lead vocals, backing vocals

Additional personnel
 Louis Austin - engineer
 Norman Goodman - artwork
 Eddie Hardin - soloist
 Gary Moberley - piano
 Geoff Westley - arranger, piano

Releases

 CD	Cut Above the Rest Repertoire	 1992
 CD	Cut Above the Rest Repertoire	 1999
 CD	Cut Above the Rest Repertoire	 2003
 CD	Cut Above the Rest 7T's / Glam	 2010

References

The Sweet albums
1979 albums
Polydor Records albums